Lathem is a surname. Notable people by that name include:

 Wyndham Lathem (born 1974), former associate professor of microbiology-immunology. 
 Lieven van Lathem (1430–1493), early Netherlandish painter and manuscript illuminator.
 Jacob van Laethem (Jacob van Lathem) (1470–1528), Flemish painter.